Niphotragulus is a genus of longhorn beetles of the subfamily Lamiinae, containing the following species:

 Niphotragulus affinis Breuning, 1954
 Niphotragulus albosignatus Breuning, 1954
 Niphotragulus batesi Kolbe, 1894
 Niphotragulus delkeskampi Breuning, 1961
 Niphotragulus leonensis Breuning, 1970
 Niphotragulus longicollis Breuning, 1942
 Niphotragulus machadoi Breuning, 1970
 Niphotragulus occidentalis Breuning, 1977
 Niphotragulus strandi Breuning, 1943

References

Pteropliini